Pescara is the capital city of the Province of Pescara, in the Abruzzo region of Italy. It is the most populated city in Abruzzo, with 119,217 (2018) residents (and approximately 350,000 including the surrounding metropolitan area). Located on the Adriatic coast at the mouth of the Aterno-Pescara River, the present-day municipality was formed in 1927 joining the municipalities of the old Pescara fortress, the part of the city to the south of the river, and Castellamare Adriatico, the part of the city to the north of the river. The surrounding area was formed into the province of Pescara.

The main commercial street of the city is Corso Umberto I, which runs between two squares, starting from Piazza della Repubblica and reaching the seacoast in Piazza Primo Maggio. The rectangle that it forms with Corso Vittorio Emanuele II and Via Nicola Fabrizi is home of the main shopping district, enclosed in a driving restriction zone, where several of the best fashion shops are located. Corso Manthoné, the course of the old Pescara, has, for many years, been the center of the nightlife of the city. City hall and the administration of the province are in Piazza Italia, near the river, and in the area between here and the D'Annunzio University campus to the south, a business district has grown up over the years, while the Marina is situated to the immediate south of the mouth of the river. Pescara is also served by an important international airport, the Abruzzo Airport, and one of the major touristic ports of Adriatic Sea and Italy, the Port of Pescara.

Geography 
Pescara is situated at sea level on the Adriatic coast and has developed from some centuries BC onwards at the strategic position around the mouth of the Aterno-Pescara River. To the south the pine forest that once gave shade to bathers along much of the Adriatic coast, has almost disappeared near the beach, but remains within the Nature Reserve Pineta Dannunziana.

The urban fabric of the city spreads over a flat T-shaped area, which occupies the valley around the river and the coastal strip. To the northwest and the southwest, the city is also expanding into the surrounding hills which were first occupied in the Neolithic period.

The whole city is affected by the presence of groundwater, the level of which varies by up to a metre, being at its highest in spring due to snow melting in the mountains inland.

The city is very close to the mountains, and the ski slopes of Passo Lanciano it only takes a 30 minutes drive.

Climate 

Pescara has a borderline Mediterranean climate (Csa) and humid subtropical climate (Cfa) with hot summers and cool winters. Since its driest month has  of precipitation, the city cannot be solely classified as Mediterranean. Not to mention, although there is a dry tendency in early summer, August (late summer) is wetter than the winter month of February, which is unusual for the Mediterranean pattern.

Pescara is a coastal city, but its climate is influenced by the surrounding mountains (the Maiella and the chain of Gran Sasso). When the wind is southwesterly, Pescara experiences a Foehn wind that often reaches , causing a sudden increase in temperature and decrease in relative humidity, and for that reason winters with temperatures that exceed  almost daily are not unknown.

Under northeasterly winds Pescara suffers precipitation which is generally weak, but can be much more intense if accompanied by a depression. Also from the north east comes winter weather from Siberia that, on average, brings abundant snowfalls every 3–4 years. In summer the weather is mostly stable and sunny with temperatures that, thanks to the sea breeze, rarely exceed 35 degrees unless a southwesterly Libeccio is blowing. Particularly in summer, but also in winter, the high humidity leads to morning and evening mist or haze.

History 

Pescara's origins precede the Roman conquest. It was founded to be the port of Vestini and Marrucini tribes to trade with the peoples of the Orient, a supporting role that was held for centuries. The name of both the town and the river was Aternum (in Greek Άτερνος), it was connected to Rome through the Via Claudia Valeria and the Via Tiburtina. The main building was the temple of Jovis Aternium. The town was an important port for trade with the Eastern provinces of the Empire.

In the Middle Ages it was destroyed by the Lombards (597). Saint Cetteus, the town's patron saint, was a bishop of the 6th century, elected to the see of Amiternum in Sabina (today the city of San Vittorino) in 590, during the pontificate of Gregory the Great.  His legend goes that he was executed by the Lombards at Amiternum by being thrown off a bridge with a stone tied around his neck; his body floated to Pescara.In 1095 Pescara was a fishing village enriched with monuments and churches. In 1140 Roger of Sicily conquered the town, giving rise to a period in which it was destroyed by armies ravaging the Kingdom of Sicily. The name of Piscaria ("abounding with fish") is mentioned for the first time in this period. Several seignors ruled over Pescara afterwards, including Rainaldo Orsini, Louis of Savoy and Francesco del Borgo, the vicar of king Ladislaus of Naples, who had the fortress and the tower built. The subsequent rulers were the D'Avalos. In 1424 the famous condottiero Muzio Attendolo died here. Another adventurer, Jacopo Caldora, conquered the town in 1435 and 1439. In the following years Pescara was repeatedly attacked by the Venetians, and later, as part of the Spanish Kingdom of Naples, it was turned into a massive fortress.

In 1566 it was besieged by 105 Turk galleys. It resisted fiercely and the Ottomans only managed to ravage the surrounding territory.

At the beginning of the 18th century Pescara had some 3,000 inhabitants, half of them living in Castellammare, a small frazione of the fortress. In 1707 it was attacked by Austrian troops under the command of the Count of Wallis: the town, led by Giovanni Girolamo II Acquaviva, resisted for two months before capitulating.

Pescara was always part of the Kingdom of Naples, apart from the brief age of the Republic of Naples of 1798–99. The town was therefore attacked by the pro-Bourbon Giuseppe Pronio. In 1800 Pescara fell to French troops, becoming an important military stronghold of Joseph Bonaparte's reign. Castellammare, which now had 3,000 inhabitants of its own, became a separate municipality.

In 1814, Pescara's Carboneria revolted against Joachim Murat. There, on 15 May 1815, the king undersigned one of the first constitutions of the Italian Risorgimento. In the following years Pescara became a symbol of the Bourbon's violent restoration as it housed one of the most notorious Bourbon jails. After a devastating flood in 1853, Pescara was liberated by Giuseppe Garibaldi's collaborator Clemente De Caesaris in 1860. Seven years later the fortress was dismantled.

In the sixty following years Pescara was included in the Province of Chieti and then merged with the adjacent town of Castellammare Adriatico and eventually became the largest city of its region. The new city suffered heavy civilian casualties when it was bombed by the Allies who were attempting to cut German supply lines during World War II. It has since been massively rebuilt, becoming a very modern coastal city of Italy.

Government

Main sights 

The city is divided in two by the river in between.

The historic city center is located on the south shore, where once stood the Piazzaforte (fortified town), a military bulwark of the Kingdom of the Two Sicilies. There is the Bagno Borbonico (the old prison of the Kingdom of the Two Sicilies, built starting in 1510 by order of Charles V, which incorporated inside the remains of the Norman and Byzantine city walls). Today it houses the Museum of the Abruzzi people: the institution traces, through 13 halls dedicated to aspects of life, traditions and economy, 4,000 years of history of the Abruzzo people.

In the historic city center are the birthplace houses of Gabriele D'Annunzio and Ennio Flaiano, and the San Cetteo Cathedral, built between 1933 and 1938.

On the north shore of the river there's Piazza Italia (Italy Square), overlooked by the City Hall and the Government Building (which houses the headquarters of the Province of Pescara), both built during the Fascist era according to the fascist rationalist style and designed by the architect Vincenzo Pilotti. Mr. Pilotti designed the majority of the public buildings of the city, including the seat of the local Chamber of Commerce, of the Liceo Classico "G. D'Annunzio" high school, and the old seat of the court (which now houses a museum).

In the far southern part of the city, between the Nature Reserve Pineta Dannunziana and the beach, there is an elegant Art Nouveau villas district designed in 1912 by Antonino Liberi (an engineer brother-in-law of D'Annunzio). There is also the Aurum, first headquarters of a social club (called the Kursaal), then liquor factory, and today public multipurpose space.

In 2007 was built the Ponte del Mare, the largest pedestrian and cycle bridge in Italy.

On the northern waterfront, close to the Salotto Square, the main square of the city, there is the Nave (trad. the ship), a sculpture by Pietro Cascella.

Economy 

Pescara is the most populous city in the Abruzzo region, and is one of the top ten economic, commercial, and tourist centers on the Adriatic coast. Situated in the sea at a short distance from the waterline there are many breakwaters made with large rocks, that were placed to preserve the shore from water-flood erosion.

In the city there are the administrative headquarters of De Cecco company and the Fater S.p.a., an equal joint venture partner with the Angelini Group and Procter & Gamble.

Culture 

Every July Pescara holds an international jazz festival: Pescara Jazz was the first Italian summer festival dedicated to jazz music. Since 1969, it has been one of the most important jazz festivals in Europe, as reported by the main dedicated international magazines.

Every year (between June and July) the city also holds the Flaiano Prizes, one of Italy's International Film Festivals.

Pescara was the birthplace of Gabriele D'Annunzio and Ennio Flaiano. Vittoria Colonna was the marchioness of Pescara.

University
Pescara and Chieti are the homes of the G. d'Annunzio University. Pescara is home to the Departments of Architecture, Economics, Business Administration, Quantitative Economics, Social and Legal Sciences, Modern Languages Literatures and Cultures, as Chieti, together with the Rector and Academic Senate, is home to the Departments of Medicine and Science of Aging, Experimental and Clinical Sciences, Neuroscience and Imaging, Oral Health Sciences and Biotechnology, Pharmacy, Humanities, Arts and Social Sciences, Humanities Psychological Sciences, Engineering and Geology for a total of about 31,257 students in the 2011 .

Since 2009, Rome ISIA has a subsidiary in Pescara, training students in the field of industrial design.

In the city center is located the headquarters of ICRANet, the International Center for Relativistic Astrophysics Network, an international organization promoting research activities in relativistic astrophysics and related areas.

Sports 
The city has a football team, Delfino Pescara 1936, which in June 2012 was promoted to Serie A, the highest league in Italy. Pescara Calcio, who have played 38 seasons in the cadet championship, have spent 7 previous seasons in Serie A, especially in the 1980s–90s.

Pescara hosted the 2009 Mediterranean Games, having defeated Rijeka, Croatia and Patras, Greece for the privilege. In 2015, from 28 August to 6 September, the first edition of the Mediterranean Beach Games was held in the city in 2015.

Between 1924 and 1961, Pescara hosted the Coppa Acerbo automobile race, which in 1957 formed the penultimate round of the World Championship of Drivers.

Since 2011 the Italian edition of the Ironman 70.3 takes place in the city of Pescara, chosen for the characteristics of the territory, for the possibility of building a competition that starts from the sea, continue towards the mountains and ends in the city center.

Transport 

As regards public transport Pescara has a wide assortment of services, the city benefits from it a very favourable position with regard to roads.

Motorways
The territory between Pescara and Chieti is crossed by two pan-European roads, autostrada A14 (Italy) Bologna – Taranto and autostrada A25 (Italy) Torano – Pescara, connected with the local bypass road system.

Airport

Pescara is served from an international airport called Abruzzo Airport (Aeroporto di Pescara) that connects the entire region with many Italian and European destinations like Barcelona-Girona, Brussels-Charleroi, Frankfurt-Hahn, Kraków, London-Stansted, Paris-Beauvais, Milan-Bergamo, Copenhagen, Weeze, Milan Linate, Tirana, Bucarest, Palermo, Catania and Olbia.

From the bus stop in front of the railway station there has been a daily connection of ITA Airways by bus, to and from Rome Fiumicino Airport since 1 December 2022, allowing a connection with the airline's hub.

Port
Pescara is served by the Port of Pescara for fishing, yachting, cargo docking and commercial passenger services. In summer season ferries and hydrofoils to Croatia run primarily by SNAV to Split and islands in central Dalmatia, but often they set out from the larger and better equipped Port of Ortona.

Rail
The city has four railway stations, Pescara Centrale railway station is the main and largest in Abruzzo, as well as one of the larger railway stations without train terminal in Italy, connecting with some of the major Italian cities like Rome, Milan, Turin, Bologna, Bari, Ancona, Trieste and many other cities. The other stations are Pescara Porta Nuova, Pescara Tribunale and Pescara San Marco.

Bus
Pescara is served from several bus lines (operated by TUA, Società unica abruzzese di trasporto). There is a direct bus line to Roma Tiburtina (Rome) via Pescara Centrale (about a two and a half hour ride).

Trolleybus
A trolleybus automatic steering system line connecting the city center with its strategic points like Pescara Centrale railway station and the Abruzzo International Airport and other nearby cities is being built.

Notable people 
 
 
 Federico Caffè (1914–1987), economist
 Andrea Caldarelli (1990–), racing driver
 Giada Colagrande (1975–), actress and film director
 Gabriele D'Annunzio (1863–1938), poet, novelist and politician
 Ildebrando D'Arcangelo (1969–), opera singer
 Giovanni De Benedictis (1968–), retired race walker
 Eusebio Di Francesco (1969–), Football Manager of Cagliari Calcio
 Ennio Flaiano (1910–1972), screenwriter, novelist, journalist
 Francesco Panzieri (1985–), visual effects artist
 Stefano Pessina (1941–), business man and Executive Chairman of Alliance Boots
 Stefano Prizio (1988–), footballer
 Sara Serraiocco (1990–), actress
 Floria Sigismondi (1965–), Canadian photographer and director
 Enzo Trulli (2005–), racing driver and son of Jarno Trulli
 Jarno Trulli (1974–), former Formula One driver
 Marco Verratti (1992–), Italian footballer

Twin towns

Pescara is a twin city with:

 Arcachon, France
 Miami Beach, United States
 Lima, Peru
 Split, Croatia
 Brescia, Italy
 Casale Monferrato, Italy

See also 
Roman Catholic Archdiocese of Pescara-Penne
Museo d'Arte Moderna Vittoria Colonna
Birthplace of Gabriele D'Annunzio Museum
Museo Paparella Treccia Devlet

References

External links 

 Official website
 Pescara Airport
 Università D'Annunzio

 
Coastal towns in Abruzzo
Mediterranean port cities and towns in Italy
Port cities and towns of the Adriatic Sea